Mississippi Shipping Company (also called Delta Line) of New Orleans, Louisiana was a passenger and cargo steamship company founded in 1919. In 1961 officially changed its name to the Delta Line.  The Mississippi Shipping Co. serviced port from the Gulf of Mexico and east coast of South America.  The Mississippi Shipping Co. was formed to support coffee merchants and Brazilian produce to New Orleans and up the Mississippi River. competing with the New York City trade.  Delta Line failed to upgrade to container ships and modernize as other shipping lines did in the 1970s. In 1982 Delta Line, now owned by the Holiday Inn Corporation sold the line to Crowley Maritime. Crowley was the largest US barge and tugboat operator at the time. Crowley started to modernize the ships on the route, but sold the shipping line to the United States Lines in 1985. United States Lines brought some of the ships into its routes but went bankrupt in 1986. At its peak in 1949, the Mississippi-Delta line owned 14 ships at a total of 98,000 grt. Delta Line also moved into passenger cruise with to ship. During World War II the Mississippi Shipping Company was active with charter shipping with the Maritime Commission and War Shipping Administration. During wartime, the Mississippi Shipping Company operated Victory ships, Liberty shipss, and a few Empire ships.

Routes
Routes from 1919 to 1967.
US Ports:New Orleans and Houston
South America: Saint Thomas, Barbados, Curaçao, Rio de Janeiro, Santo, Brazil, Paranaguá, Montevideo, Buenos Aires
Routes from 1978 to 1982:
Vancouver, Tacoma, San Francisco, Los Angeles, Manzanillo, Balboa, Panama Canal, Cartagena, Puerto Cabello, La Guaira, Rio de Janeiro, Santos, Paranagua/Rio Grande (optional), Buenos Aires, Strait of Magellan, Valparaiso, Callao, Guayaquil, Buenaventura, Los Angeles, San Francisco, Vancouver, Tacoma. Seansonal port:Curaçao, Aruba, Recife, Montevideo, Antofagasta and Corinto.
Starting in 1961 West Africa cargo routes to:
Angol, Cameroon, Ivory Coast, Liberia  and Congo.

Del ships
 The three "Del" cruise ships, designed by naval architect George G. Sharp of New York, Type C3-class ship hull with a custom design. Built at Ingalls Shipyard in Pascagoula, Mississippi at $7,000,000 each. Completed in 1946 and 1947, the three had new commercial radar. Delta Line (Mississippi) had two departures per month from Gulf of Mexico ports to the Caribbean and South America. Passenger cruise service ended in 1967 and the ships were converted to cargo. In 1975 the three were scrapped in Indonesia.
SS Del Norte
SS Del Sud
SS Del Mar

SS Delmundo, a 1919 cargo ship torpedoed in 1942 by U-600 and sank off Cuba, eight crew were killed.  
SS Delbrasil
SS Delorleans
SS Deltargentino
SS Del Uruguay, taken over by the US Navy during construction, became USS Charles Carroll (APA-28) in 1942 
SS Delvalle, sunk by U-154 in April 1942

Other ships

SS Agawam
SS Coastal Observer
SS Irish Oak, a 1919 cargo ship, Mississippi Shipping Company owned 1928–1933.
SS Del Santos, for six months in 1942, became USS Thurston

Santa Ships
Starting in 1978 to 1984 operated four "Santa" ships: All four C4-S1-49a ship were sold to Crowley Maritime in 1984. All four were purchased from the Grace Line - Prudential Lines by Delta Line. Built in 1963 at Bethlehem Sparrows Point Shipyard. All were scrapped in 1988.
Santa Magdalena
Santa Mercedes 
Santa Mariana 
Santa Maria

World War 2

World War 2 Maritime ships:
 SS Aiken Victory
 SS Bluefield Victory 
SS Brazil Victory
SS Benjamin Contee
 SS Carthage Victory 
 SS Charles Henderson
 SS Cuba Victory
 SS Luray Victory
 SS Oshkosh Victory
 SS Ouachita Victory
 SS Tulane Victory
 SS Josiah Parker
 SS Robert M. La Follette
 SS Clarence King
 SS Harriet Monroe
 SS Murray M. Blum
 SS John A. Roebling
Empire Shearwater
USS Thurston
SS West Kasson
SS Union Victory (Korean War operator)

References

Defunct shipping companies of the United States
Transport companies established in 1919
1919 establishments in Louisiana